Los Luceros is an unincorporated community and census-designated place in Rio Arriba County, New Mexico, United States. Its population was 906 as of the 2010 census.

It includes or is close to Los Luceros Hacienda, a historic plantation with chapel that is listed on the National Register of Historic Places.

Geography

Demographics

Education
It is in Española Public Schools. The comprehensive public high school is Española Valley High School.

References

Census-designated places in New Mexico
Census-designated places in Rio Arriba County, New Mexico